The Wales Institute of Social and Economic Research, Data and Methods (WISERD) is an interdisciplinary social science research centre with its administrative base at Cardiff University, Wales. Its aim is to draw together and build upon the existing expertise in quantitative and qualitative research methods and methodologies.

The institute is a collaborative venture between the Universities of Cardiff, Swansea, Aberystwyth, Bangor and South Wales. Funding is jointly provided by the Welsh Assembly Government (via the Higher Education Funding Council for Wales, HEFCW), and the UK Economic and Social Research Council (ESRC).

The Wales Institute of Social and Economic Research, Data & Methods (WISERD) was established in 2008. Its current director is Professor Ian Rees Jones. The principal aims of WISERD are:
 To develop the quality and quantity of social science research in Wales, particularly through externally funded research projects;
 To promote collaborative research activity across the participating universities and across disciplines and sectors;
 To develop the social science research infrastructure in Wales; and
 To strengthen the impact of social science research on the development of policy in the public, private and third sectors through a focus on knowledge exchange and engagement.

WISERD seeks to achieve these aims through two programmes: a research programme and a research infrastructure programme.

WISERD's research programme consists of activities from basic science to applied research projects, within the following key themes: Civil Society; Education; Health, Wellbeing and Social Care; Economic and Social Inequalities; Localities; and Data and Methods.

WISERD Civil Society
WISERD Civil Society is a research centre, launched in October 2014 and funded by the Economic and Social Research Council. It is undertaking a five-year programme of research addressing Civil Society in Wales, the UK and internationally.

Its four research themes are:
 Locality, Community and Civil Society;
 Institutions and Governance;
 Economic Austerity, Social Enterprise and Equality; and
 Generation, Life Course and Social Participation.

References

Social science institutes
Research institutes in Wales
Cardiff University
Think tanks based in Wales